Bar Aftab-e Kashkeli (also Romanized as Bar Āftāb-e Kāshkelī; also known as Bar Āftāb-e Kāshgelī, Kūshkelī, and Shahrak-e Kāshgelī) is a village in Pian Rural District, in the Central District of Izeh County, Khuzestan Province, Iran. At the 2006 census, its population was 873, in 158 families.

References 

Populated places in Izeh County